Robert Anthony Wild (born March 30, 1940) is the former President of Marquette University, returning to the administration after serving as president from 1996 to 2011. He has been a member of the Society of Jesus (the Jesuits) since 1957.

Background, education and career
He earned a master's degree in classical language from Loyola University Chicago and a doctorate of religion from Harvard University. From 1964 to 1967, Wild taught Latin, Greek, and speech and debate at St. Xavier High School in Cincinnati, Ohio. He has also taught at Harvard University, Loyola University Chicago, the Pontifical Biblical Institute in Rome, and Marquette University.

Wild was interim president of Marquette University from October, 2013, through August, 2014.

References

External links
Marquette University

Harvard Divinity School alumni
Loyola University Chicago alumni
Presidents of Marquette University
20th-century American Jesuits
21st-century American Jesuits
St. Ignatius College Prep alumni
St. Xavier High School (Ohio) people
1940 births
Living people
Academic staff of the Pontifical Biblical Institute
American expatriates in Italy